After The War is a World War I song written by Wm. H. Craft and composed by C. B. Nitsche. The song was self-published in 1916 by Craft & Nitsche. The sheet music cover depicts a country house with a woman receiving mail from the mailman.

The sheet music can be found at the Pritzker Military Museum & Library.

References 

1916 songs
Songs of World War I